Epic is a compilation album by American R&B musician R. Kelly, released September 13, 2010, in Europe through Jive Records and Sony Music. The album is a collection of hit ballads by Kelly such as "The World's Greatest", "If I Could Turn Back the Hands of Time", "I'm Your Angel", and "I Believe I Can Fly". He also recorded five new ballads for the record including the official 2010 FIFA World Cup anthem and first single "Sign of a Victory".

Background
Epic features four new and unreleased songs alongside a selection of "aspirational songs and timeless R. Kelly classics", Epic is the first to emerge from a trio of albums that R. Kelly plans to release in 2010 including Love Letter and Zodiac.

Singles
 "Sign of a Victory" is the album's only single and it peaked at number 81 on the US Billboard Hot R&B/Hip-Hop Songs chart. The single was the official 2010 FIFA World Cup anthem and was also featured on Listen Up! The Official 2010 FIFA World Cup Album.

Track listing
All songs written and produced by R. Kelly.

References

External links
R-Kelly.com - official website

2010 compilation albums
R. Kelly albums
Albums produced by Polow da Don
Albums produced by R. Kelly
Jive Records compilation albums